Jay Henry Sandrich (February 24, 1932 – September 22, 2021) was an American television director who primarily worked on sitcoms. In 2020, he was inducted into the Television Hall of Fame.

Early life 
Jay Sandrich was born February 24, 1932, in Los Angeles. He was the son of director Mark Sandrich. The younger Sandrich attended the University of California, Los Angeles, graduating with a B.A. in 1953.

Career
Sandrich began his television work in the mid-1950s as a second assistant director with Desilu Productions, and began his career as an assistant director on I Love Lucy and assistant to the producer on The Andy Griffith Show. Sandrich directed and/or produced episodes of The Bill Dana Show; The Bill Cosby Show; Get Smart; The Odd Couple; Paul Sand in Friends and Lovers; Loves Me, Loves Me Not; Soap; two-thirds of the episodes of The Mary Tyler Moore Show in early seasons; and the first three seasons of The Cosby Show. He was responsible for the series pilots of The Bob Newhart Show, WKRP in Cincinnati, Benson, Empty Nest and The Golden Girls. His last work as a director on television was an episode of Two and a Half Men in 2003. Sandrich also directed for Theatre Aspen, in Aspen, Colorado, Rounding Third (2008), Chapter Two (2009), and Same Time, Next Year (2010). The only theatrical movie he directed was the film Seems Like Old Times (1980), originally written by Neil Simon.
 
In 1965, Sandrich put in his only stint as a producer, serving as associate producer for the first season of the NBC-TV comedy Get Smart, which co-starred Don Adams and Barbara Feldon. He enjoyed the experience but vowed to stick to directing in future. He told Andy Meisler of Channels magazine, "I really didn't like producing. I liked being on the stage. I found that, as a producer, I'd stay up until four in the morning worrying about everything. As a director, I slept at night."

Meisler's article also paints an appealing portrait of the director's relationship with Bill Cosby, who preferred Sandrich, who directed 100 episodes of The Cosby Show from 1985 to 1992, the series' last season, as the director of choice of the series, and with other Cosby production personnel, quoting co-executive producer Tom Werner on the show's dynamics: "Although we're really all here to service Bill Cosby's vision, the show is stronger because Jay challenges Bill and pushes him when appropriate." Sandrich was proud of the program's pioneering portrayal of an upper-class Black family, and of its civilized view of parent-child relations.

Death
Sandrich died from complications of dementia at his home in Los Angeles on September 22, 2021, at age 89.

Further reading
Kuney, Jack. Take One: Television Directors on Directing.  New York: Greenwood, 1990.
Meisler, Andy. "Jay Sandrich: Ace of Pilots." Channels magazine (New York), October 1986.
Ravage, John W. Television: The Director's Viewpoint. Boulder, Colorado: Westview,  1978.

References

External links

Museum of Broadcast Communications biography 

1932 births
2021 deaths
American Jews
American television directors
Deaths from dementia in California
Directors Guild of America Award winners
Primetime Emmy Award winners
Film directors from Los Angeles